1798 in sports describes the year's events in world sport.

Boxing
Events
 Jack Bartholomew retained his English Championship title but no fights involving him are recorded in 1798.

Cricket
Events
 With inter-county fixtures not being played again until 1825, the records show a considerable increase in matches played by town clubs rather than county teams.
England
 Most runs – Lord Frederick Beauclerk 369
 Most wickets – Thomas Boxall 42

Horse racing
England
 The Derby – Sir Harry
 The Oaks – Bellissima
 St Leger Stakes – Symmetry

References

 
1798